Broadheath may refer to the following places in England:

Broadheath (a local government electoral ward in the Borough of Halton, Cheshire)
Broadheath (a local government electoral ward in Torridge District, Devon)
Broadheath, Greater Manchester (a suburb of Altrincham)
Broadheath (Trafford ward) (a local government electoral ward in the Metropolitan Borough of Trafford, Greater Manchester)
Lower Broadheath, a village and civil parish in Worcestershire
Broadheath (a local government electoral ward in Malvern Hills District, Worcestershire)